The Armstrong Siddeley Genet  is a five-cylinder, air-cooled, radial engine for aircraft use built in the UK, first run in 1926. It developed 80 hp at 2,200 rpm in its final form and was a popular light aircraft powerplant. Following the company tradition with a slight deviation the engine was named after the Genet, a catlike animal of the same order but different family.

Variants and applications

Genet I
Genet I producing 65 hp.
 Avro 618 Ten
 Avro Avian prototype
 Blackburn Bluebird I
 BFW M.23
 Cierva autogyros.  C.9 and C.10
 Drzewiecki JD-2
 Fleet Fawn
 Junkers A50 Junior
 Medwecki and Nowakowski M.N.5
 Saro Cutty Sark
 Southern Martlet
 Westland-Hill Pterodactyl

Genet II

The Genet II produced 80 hp due to an increased compression ratio of 5.25:1.
 ANEC IV
 Avro Avian
 Blackburn Bluebird II
 Cierva C.19 autogyro
 Darmstadt D-18
 de Havilland DH.60 Moth
 Fairchild 21
 Klemm Kl 25
 Nicholas-Beazley NB-8G
 Parnall Imp
 Robinson Redwing II
 Southern Martlet
 Westland Widgeon

Genet IIA
Also 80 hp and with minor differences to the Mark I.
 Robinson Redwing II

Engines on display
Two preserved Armstrong Siddeley Genets are on static display at the Shuttleworth Collection, Old Warden, Bedfordshire.

A preserved Genet is on display at the Australian National Aviation Museum, Moorabbin, Victoria, Australia

There is a restored Genet at the New England Air Museum, Bradley Int'l Airport, Windsor Locks, CT.

A Genet is on display at the Aviation Heritage Museum (Western Australia).

Specifications (Genet I)

See also

References

Notes

Bibliography

 
 Lumsden, Alec. British Piston Engines and their Aircraft. Marlborough, Wiltshire: Airlife Publishing, 2003. .

External links

 Armstrong Siddeley Genet at the Australian National Aviation Museum
 

1920s aircraft piston engines
Aircraft air-cooled radial piston engines
Genet